The Negros Slashers also known as the RCPI-Negros Slashers were a professional basketball team in the Metropolitan Basketball Association from 1998 to 2002. The team enjoyed considerable success, winning the MBA National Championship in 2002, the last season of the said league. The team was based in Bacolod, Negros Occidental.

History

1998: Formation of the team in The Inaugural Season
The team was named "Slashers" based on the cane knives' slashing motion used by itinerant sugar workers to cut sugarcane stalks.  Sugar is the main product of Negros Occidental. Bacolod businessmen Oscar "Dodong" Bascon and Babes Alvarez painstakingly formed the team composed of amateur standouts mostly from the Visayas-Mindanao leagues and former professional players from Philippine Basketball Association.  Ronnie "DJ" Dejarlo was the first player to sign a contract with the team. Among the players that formed the team were Maui Huelar, Erwin Framo, Johnedel Cardel, John Ferriols, Allen Sasan and Jack Tanuan. Negrense Rolly Buenaflor was named as head coach.

The Negros Slashers played their first two games on the road against the Batangas Blades and Manila Metrostars, losing on both occasions despite having a solid team with a mix of veterans and newcomers. Rolly Buenaflor was relieved of head coaching duties shortly after and was replaced by Junel Baculi. But tragedy struck the team on the eve of their third game in Cebu City when their main player, DJ Dejarlo, was found dead in their hotel room due to pancreatitis. Fueled by Dejarlo's unexpected death, the Slashers won their first game against eventual archrival Cebu Gems.  Since then, the Slashers found their winning ways and became one of Southern Conference's formidable teams.  But Baculi left the team before the second round of eliminations and was replaced by Cebuano coach Jun Noel. The team also signed up Palarong Pambansa standouts Reynel Hugnatan, Ryan Gamboa and Leo Bat-og to bolster their frontline.

They were able to barge in the National Playoffs and faced the Cebu Gems in the first Southern Conference Finals, marred by numerous fan incidents on and off court.  They won the series 4-3 and went on to face the Pampanga Dragons.  But luck worn out on them as the more experienced Dragons (bannered by former PBA MVP Ato Agustin) won the first MBA National Championship.  Negros Slashers team captain John Ferriols was named the inaugural season's Most Valuable Player.

The Negros Slashers were grouped together with the Cebu Gems, Iloilo Volts, Davao Eagles, Socsargen Marlins and Cagayan de Oro Nuggets in the Southern Conference division.

1999: Sophomore Season Jinx
Things looked rosy for the Negros Slashers after winning the Southern Conference crown and finishing runner-up to MBA National Champions Pampanga Dragons. They got the right to host the first MBA All Star game which pitted teams from the North Conference against teams from the Southern Conference. John Ferriols, Jack Tanuan and Johnedel Cardel proudly represented the Slashers for the South team.  During the offseason, the management held tryouts for MBA players who were released by their mother teams. Among the new recruits for the Slashers were center Mike Otto, former Iloilo Volts forward Judge Primero, former PBA veterans Romy dela Rosa and Roel Bravo. Former Pangasinan Presidents head coach Robert Sison was also hired as the team's assistant coach for Jun Noel.

The second season opened for the Slashers with them hosting the opening ceremonies for the Southern Conference in Bacolod City. However, they were beaten by the new-look Iloilo Megavoltz (headlined by new recruit Vince Hizon) in their first game for the new season. But the Slashers quickly bounced back by winning successive games against their closest rivals. With the Visayas division title at stake, the Slashers tried to qualify for a finals berth but were beaten to it by rivals Cebu Gems and Iloilo Megavoltz, who eventually won the Visayas division crown.

During the season's second round of elimination, the Slashers roster underwent a major revamp following the exit of star center Jack Tanuan, who suffered a kidney disease which left him blind in the right eye. The Slashers management traded back-up center Mike Otto to Pasig Rizal Pirates in exchange for bruiser Lito Aguilar, promoted back-up center Reynel Hugnatan to starter status, and recruited 2 Fil-foreigners in 6-1 combo guard Dean Labayen (who was originally scheduled to play for Barangay Ginebra in the PBA) and 6-8 center Dorian Pena. Both players traced their roots to Negros Occidental. But Labayen only played until the first game of the semifinal round as the Bureau of Immigration cracked down on Fil-foreigner players who were found to be fake or lacking work documents.

The new-look Slashers were able to bamboozle their way through the elimination round but momentum slipped for them when they faced their archrivals the Cebu Gems in the semifinals. The Gems paraded 6-9 Fil-Am Matt Mitchell as counterpart to Pena. The bigger and more skilled Mitchell teamed up with Cebu's main gunner Dondon Hontiveros to lead the Gems against the Slashers en route to the Southern Conference Finals vs the Iloilo Megavoltz.

2000–2001: Return to the Finals with a new coach, another Finals heartbreak
With the Slashers losing their Southern Conference title to their bitter rivals, changes were in order for the team. They released Lito Aguilar, hometown players Nonoy Sayon and Ryan Gamboa, and Fil-Ams Dean Labayen and Dorian Pena during the offseason. Pena and Gamboa found a home in Pasig Rizal Pirates while Sayon played for archrival Cebu Gems.  They signed up free agent guard Dennis Madrid, free agent forward Ruben dela Rosa (also Romy's brother) and acquired forwards Cid White from Nueva Ecija Patriots and Alvin Teng from the Laguna Lakers.

A controversial coaching change happened midway in the first round of eliminations when long-time coach Jun Noel was replaced by assistant coach Robert Sison. Although the change was welcomed by most Negros fans, there was a rejection coming from one of the disgruntled owners of the franchise. It almost caused a distraction to the team but eventually the conflict was resolved when Sison started to win games with the team.

With the whole team playing inspired basketball the whole season, the Slashers were able to avenge the bitter defeat they experienced in the recent Southern Conference Finals against the Cebu Gems, who were playing without their main man Dondon Hontiveros who already left them for greener pastures with the Tanduay Rhum Masters in the PBA. The Slashers faced a tall team in San Juan Knights in the 3rd MBA National Finals but despite possessing quickness to make up for lack of ceiling, they were overpowered by the Knights in six games.

Prior to the season the Slashers were merged with the Iloilo Megavoltz as part of the league's streamlining operations.  But unlike other merged teams that had strong lineups (Manila-Batangas had the strongest roster), the Slashers did not take in any players from the Megavoltz team as it disbanded. However, they were able to sign up former Iloilo Megavoltz player Michael Almonte as a free agent. The team also released Alvin Teng.  The decision was made owing to his sub-par performance during Game 4 of the MBA Championship Series against the San Juan Knights in 2000 (he was pulled out of that game, sat on the bench, untied his shoelaces and donned his practice jersey), and for not showing up in the following game (he actually called-in sick and did not play).

The team relied heavily on its regular rotation of Ferriols, Cardel, Huelar, Bat-og, Hugnatan, brothers Romy and Ruben dela Rosa, White and newly acquired ex-La Salle guard Dino Aldeguer, who was waived by the Alaska Aces. Just like the previous season, the Slashers again handily won the Southern Conference Championship this time against the TPG-Davao Eagles. In their third trip to the MBA National Finals, the Slashers faced the LBC Batangas Blades but lost in four games.

2002: MBA Crossover Champions/National Champions, final season
In 2002, TV broadcast partner ABS-CBN withdrew its support and funding for the league. As a result, the league had to be commercialized, allowing teams to look for sponsors.  Negros Slashers found one in remittance company RCPI and was renamed the RCPI Negros Slashers, barely 2 weeks before the season started. Robert Sison resigned as head coach and was replaced by Joshua Villapando. The roster underwent a major revamp as long-time Negros Slasher Johnedel Cardel left the team to sign up with expansion team Olongapo Volunteers. New faces in the team included Jose Francisco, Tyrone Bautista and 6-10 former La Salle Green Archer Vincent San Diego.

The Slashers became the dominant team in a league that was reeling from heavy financial losses. It was able to capture the MBA First Conference title (dubbed as Crossover Conference) where they exacted revenge on their rival in last year's National Finals, the Batangas Blades. At the same time, their championship was dedicated to their former player, Jack Tanuan who died on April 4, 2002 after battling a kidney disease.

The league stopped operations on July 26, 2002 due to continued financial loss. Because there was no MBA National Champion declared for the season, the Crossover Conference championship won by Negros Slashers was considered an official MBA title, making them National Champions by default.

Uniforms
In the first season, the Slashers was color navy and white were used in 1998 season. In 1999 replaced with color red, navy blue and white in the second season. In 2000, the Slashers was replaced color blue, red and white contains with FedEx logo in the bottom of the Slashers logo. From 2001, the Slashers was color navy blue, blue and white. In the last year 2002, renames RCPI-Negros Slashers in same color.

1999 Roster

Other notable players
 Michael Almonte
 Ronnie Dejarlo†
 Reuben dela Rosa
 Dean Labayen
 Dennis Madrid
 Mike Manigo
 Dorian Peña
 Judge Primero
 Eulo Regala
 Aldrich Reyes
 Cid White #4
 James Yap

Retired numbers
7 - DJ Dejarlo
41 - Jack Tanuan

References

Basketball teams established in 1998
Metropolitan Basketball Association teams
Basketball teams disestablished in 2002
Sports in Negros Occidental
1998 establishments in the Philippines
2002 disestablishments in the Philippines